Pandirimancham is a 1991 Indian Telugu-language film, produced by Balaram under the Sri Anupama Productions banner and directed by Omkaar. It stars Jagapathi Babu, Radha, Bhagyasri and music composed by Raj–Koti.

Plot
The film begins in a village, where a concocted saint Madana Gopala Krishna Sastry tyrants with the aid of President Pedda Venkata Rayudu, but his nephew Rajesh always impedes them. So, they hire a goon Rowdygaru from town to encounter Rajesh. Madhuravani, a prostitute is reformed by Rowdygaru and also loves him. Anyhow, he falls for Sastry's sister-in-law Seeta. The remaining story is about how Rowdygaru teaches a lesson to Sastry & President and sets the village to rights.

Cast
Jagapathi Babu as Rowdygaru
Radha as Madhuravani
Bhagyasri as sseta
Omkaar as Madana Gopala Krishna Sastry
Rajesh as Rajesh
Narra Venkateswara Rao as President Pedda Venkata Rayudu
Mallikarjuna Rao as Shetty
Gadiraju Subba Rao as Comrade
Chidatala Appa Rao
Vijaya Lalitha as Mahalakshmi
Annapoorna as Rajesh's mother
Lathasri as Subbulu
Kalpana Rai

Soundtrack

Music composed by Raj–Koti. Lyrics are written by Omkaar. Music released on Surya Audio Company.

References

1991 films
1990s Telugu-language films
Indian romance films
Films about prostitution in India
Films scored by Raj–Koti
1990s romance films